"Diana" is a song written and first performed by Paul Anka, who recorded it in May 1957 at Don Costa’s studio in New York City. Anka stated in his autobiography that the song was inspired by a girl named Diana Ayoub (13 March 1939 – 1 December 2022), whom he had met at his church and community events, and had developed a crush on. Session musicians on the record included George Barnes (musician) playing lead guitar, Bucky Pizzarelli playing the "Calypso" riff on guitar, Irving Wexler on piano, Jerry Bruno on bass, and Panama Francis on drums. The song was recorded in May 1957 at RCA Studios in New York.  Backup singers included Artie Ripp.

Paul Anka's original 1957 recording reached number 1 (for two weeks) on the Billboard "R&B Best Sellers In Stores" chart, (although it climbed no higher than number 2 on Billboard′s composite "Top 100" chart) and has reportedly sold over nine million copies. "Diana" also hit number one on the R&B Best Sellers chart. It also reached number 1 on the UK's New Musical Express chart, staying there for nine weeks, and sold 1.25 million copies in the UK.

After signing with RCA Records, Anka re-recorded "Diana", along with many other hits in 1963, for the album Paul Anka's 21 Golden Hits.

Chart performance

Weekly charts

Year-end charts

Duet with Ricky Martin

Paul Anka and Ricky Martin recorded a Spanish-language version of "Diana" and Anka included it on his album Amigos, and released it as a single in 1996.

Formats and track listings
CD Single
"Diana" – 3:41

Charts

Other Covers and adaptations
Frankie Lymon released a version of the song on his 1958 album Rock 'N Roll.

French singer Marcel Mouloudji recorded a French version, with lyrics adapted by Jacques Plante on April 22, 1958, with The Michel Villard Ensemble.

The French rock singer Johnny Hallyday sings the original version in his album issued in 1962 Johnny Hallyday Sings America's Rockin' Hits.

Paul Anka sang an Italian version of the song, also called "Diana"; the Italian lyrics were written by Mario Panzeri. This version was released on Anka's 1963 album Italiano.

In 1965, Bobby Rydell released the song as a single and on the album Somebody Loves You. Rydell's version reached No. 12 on Canada's RPM Top 40 & 5, while reaching No. 98 on the US Billboard Hot 100, No. 23 on Billboards Middle Road Singles chart, and No. 100 on the Record World 100 Top Pops.

In 1975, Australian band Ol' 55 released a version as their debut single. The song peaked at number 95 on the Kent Music Report.

A duet was in 2006 with Anka and the famous Italian singer and entertainer Adriano Celentano, with new Italian words by Giulio Rapetti (also known as Mogol) and by the same Celentano; the Italian title was "Oh Diana".

The Bulgarian band Wickeda also covered the song in a style that includes Balkanic folk elements; and the horror punk band Misfits recorded a version on their album Project 1950.

In 1959, the song was covered twice in Hindi film music. One is in the film Dil Deke Dekho with lyrics Kaun yeh aaya mehfil me, music by Usha Khanna. The other is in the film Baap bete with lyrics Bol bol bol my little dove, music by Madan Mohan.  Both songs are sung by Mohammad Rafi. The version in Dil deke dekho has a small portion at the end where Asha Bhonsle joins in.

See also
List of number-one singles in Australia during the 1950s
List of Top 25 singles for 1957 in Australia
Billboard year-end top 50 singles of 1957
List of Billboard number-one rhythm and blues hits
List of CHUM number-one singles of 1957
List of UK Singles Chart number ones of the 1950s

References

External links
 

1957 songs
1957 singles
1965 singles
1975 singles
Paul Anka songs
Bobby Rydell songs
Ol' 55 (band) songs
Songs written by Paul Anka
Number-one singles in Australia
Number-one singles in Belgium
UK Singles Chart number-one singles
ABC Records singles